Charles Harold Entwistle was an actor on stage and in films, a manager of theaters and touring theater companies, and director from England who migrated to the United States and worked in Hollywood during and after the silent film era. In England he performed for the king and queen.

He married actress Bertha Jane Ross. He was known as a character actor.

He was the uncle of Peg Entwistle who died after jumping off the H in the Hollywood Sign.

Filmography

As an actor
Salomy Jane (1914)
The Summer Girl (1916)
The Beggar of Cawnpore (1916)
One of Many (1917)
Miss Robinson Crusoe (1917)
In the Hollow of Her Hand (1918)
The Divorcee
The Woman Under Oath (1919)
The Moonstone (1934)
Paris in Spring (1935)

As director
Mrs. Wiggs of the Cabbage Patch (1914 film)

References

Year of birth missing
Place of birth missing
Year of death missing
Place of death missing
English emigrants to the United States
English theatre directors
English male stage actors
English film directors
English male silent film actors